Samuel Gross may refer to:

Samuel D. Gross (1805–1884), pioneering American academic trauma physician
Samuel Gross (Calder), an 1897 bronze statue by Alexander Stirling Calder
Samuel Gross (politician) (1776–1839), American congressman from Pennsylvania 
Samuel R. Gross, American law professor
Samuel Gross (Medal of Honor) (1891–1934), United States Marine Corps private and Medal of Honor recipient
Sam Gross (born 1933), American cartoonist

Gross, Samuel